Kluczno  is a settlement in the administrative district of Gmina Przystajń, within Kłobuck County, Silesian Voivodeship, in southern Poland.

The settlement has a population of 28.

References

Kluczno